Parisis is a genus of corals in the monotypic family Parisididae.

Species
Species in this genus include:

Parisis australis Wright & Studer, 1889
Parisis fruticosa Verrill, 1864
Parisis laxa Verrill, 1865
Parisis minor Wright & Studer, 1889
Parisis poindimia Grasshoff, 1999

References

Parisididae
Octocorallia genera